Lake Lenthall is a lake created by the Lenthalls Dam in Duckinwilla, Fraser Coast Region, Queensland, Australia. As a result of a  catchment, it takes a short time in moderate rain events to fill Lake Lenthall to 100% capacity.

History 
The dam and lake was named after the pioneering family in the district.

Its main purpose is for town water supply for Hervey Bay and surrounding townships within the Fraser Coast Region.

Fish stock
It is stocked with Australian native fish such as barramundi, bass, golden perch and silver perch under the Queensland Governments stocked impoundment permit scheme. Other aquatic species which inhabit the lake include spangled grunter, saratoga, Krefft's turtle, Flinders Ranges mogurnda, rainbow fish, fire tail gudgeon, long finned eel and many more. The lake is home to a myriad of reptiles, insects, bird life and mammals.

Angling
A Stocked Impoundment Permit is required to fish in the dam.

Other fauna
A significant population of black-breasted buttonquails reside within the dry vine rain forests found on the ridges overlooking Lake Lenthall.

See also

List of dams and reservoirs in Australia

References

External links
Lenthalls Dam / Lake Lenthall Fishing & Boating Information

Reservoirs in Queensland
Dams completed in 1984
Wide Bay–Burnett
Dams in Queensland
Fraser Coast Region